Melaleuca lazaridis is a plant in the myrtle family, Myrtaceae and is endemic to the Blackdown Tableland National Park in Queensland. (Some Australian state herbaria use the name Callistemon lazaridis). It is a shrub with dark green leaves and red flowers spikes tipped with yellow.

Description

The flowers are arranged in spikes on the ends of branches that continue to grow after flowering and also on the sides of the branches. There are 48-59 stamens in each flower with red to deep pink filaments and yellow anthers.

Taxonomy and naming
Melaleuca lazaridis was first formally described in 2006 by Lyndley Craven in Novon. The specific epithet (lazaridis) honours Michael Lazarides, an Australian botanical collector, agrostologist and co-collector of the type specimen.

Callistemon lazaridis is regarded as a synonym of Melaleuca lazaridis by the Royal Botanic Gardens, Kew.

Distribution and habitat
This melaleuca only occurs in the Blackdown Tableland National Park, where it grows in a range of habitats but often near sandstone in open forest and along creeks.

References

lazaridis
Flora of Queensland
Plants described in 2006
Taxa named by Lyndley Craven